Matrix digital rain, Matrix code, is the computer code featured in the Matrix series. The falling green code is a way of representing the activity of the simulated reality environment of the Matrix on screen by kinetic typography. All four Matrix movies, as well as the spin-off The Animatrix episodes, open with the code. It is a characteristic mark of the franchise, similar to the opening crawl featured in the Star Wars franchise.

Background 
In the film, the code that comprises the Matrix itself is frequently represented as downward-flowing green characters. This code uses a custom typeface designed by Simon Whiteley, which includes mirror images of half-width kana characters and Western Latin letters and numerals. In a 2017 interview at CNET, he attributed the design to his wife, who comes from Japan, and added, "I like to tell everybody that The Matrix's code is made out of Japanese sushi recipes".

The effect resembles that of older generation green screen displays of monochrome phosphorescent computer monitors. One predecessor of the digital rain exists in a "code-scene" of the movie Meteo, a Hungarian experimental-pop culture movie from 1990. The 1995 cyberpunk film Ghost in the Shell, a strong influence on The Matrix, features opening credits similar to the digital rain.

No official version of the code's typeface actually used in the Matrix trilogy and in the website for the game Path of Neo has been released. Several imitations have been made, mostly in the form of screensavers.

Cultural impact 

Dutch musician Arjen Anthony Lucassen named a track "Digital Rain", in honour of the movie, on his 2010 album Victims of the Modern Age by his band Star One.

The effect also inspired the creation of many unofficial Matrix screensavers.

See also 

Monochrome monitor
Simulated reality

References

External links 
 Example implementation of the Matrix digital rain in Rust
 Examples of Matrix digital rain implementations on Rosetta Code
 

Film and television opening sequences
Screensavers
Digital rain